Bill Sedgwick (born March 19, 1955) is a former NASCAR driver who was successful particularly prominent in the late 1980s and early 1990s. In 2004, Sedgwick was inducted into the West Coast Stock Car Hall of Fame.

Motorsports career results

NASCAR
(key) (Bold – Pole position awarded by qualifying time. Italics – Pole position earned by points standings or practice time. * – Most laps led.)

Winston Cup Series

Craftsman Truck Series

Winston West Series

ARCA SuperCar Series
(key) (Bold – Pole position awarded by qualifying time. Italics – Pole position earned by points standings or practice time. * – Most laps led.)

References

External links
 
 Bill Sedgwick at Driver Database

NASCAR drivers
Living people
Racing drivers from California
1955 births
Sportspeople from Los Angeles County, California
People from Acton, California
ARCA Menards Series drivers